KPXL-TV (channel 26) is a television station licensed to Uvalde, Texas, United States, broadcasting the Ion Television network to the San Antonio area. Owned by the Ion Media subsidiary of the E. W. Scripps Company, KPXL-TV maintains transmitter facilities off Highway 173/RM Road 689 on the Medina–Bandera county line (west-northwest of Lakehills).

History

The station first signed on the air on February 19, 1999; KPXL was built and signed on by Paxson Communications as an Ion owned-and-operated station of its predecessor Pax TV.

Technical information

Subchannels 
The station's digital signal is multiplexed:

Analog-to-digital conversion
Because it was granted an original construction permit after the FCC finalized the DTV allotment plan on April 21, 1997, the station did not receive a companion channel for a digital television station. KPXL-TV discontinued regular programming on its analog signal, over UHF channel 26, on June 12, 2009. The station "flash-cut" its digital signal into operation UHF channel 26.

References

External links
Ion Television official website

Ion Television affiliates
Court TV affiliates
Laff (TV network) affiliates
Ion Mystery affiliates
Scripps News affiliates
E. W. Scripps Company television stations
Television channels and stations established in 1999
KPXL-TV
1999 establishments in Texas
Uvalde, Texas